Hungarian Rhapsody (German: Ungarische Rhapsodie) is a 1928 German silent drama film directed by Hanns Schwarz and starring Lil Dagover, Willy Fritsch and Dita Parlo. It depicts the life of an impoverished Hungarian aristocrat.

It was shot at the Babelsberg Studios in Berlin and on location in Southern Hungary. Premiering at the Ufa-Palast am Zoo, it was one of the most popular German films released that year. In 1929 a soundtrack was added to the film, leading to UFA producer Erich Pommer to describe it as his first "sound film", rather than Melody of the Heart.

The film's sets were designed by the art director Erich Kettelhut.

Cast
 Lil Dagover as Camilla
 Willy Fritsch as Franz Leutnant Graf v. Turoczy
 Dita Parlo as Marika
 Fritz Greiner as Gutsverwalter Doczy - ihr Vater
 Gisela Bathory as Frau Doczy - ihre Mutter
 Erich Kaiser-Titz as General Hoffmann
 Leopold Kramer as Baron Barsody
 Andor Heltai as Ein Zigeunerprimas
 Harry Hardt as Oberleutnant Barany
 Osvaldo Valenti as Der Fähnrich
 Paul Hörbiger as Kellner
 Max Wogritsch as Bischof

References

Bibliography
 Hardt, Ursula. From Caligari to California: Erich Pommer's Life in the International Film Wars. Berghahn Books, 1996.

External links

1928 films
Films of the Weimar Republic
German silent feature films
German drama films
1928 drama films
Films directed by Hanns Schwarz
Films set in Hungary
Films with screenplays by Joe May
Films produced by Erich Pommer
Films with screenplays by Hans Székely
German black-and-white films
UFA GmbH films
Films shot in Hungary
Films shot at Babelsberg Studios
Silent drama films
1920s German films
1920s German-language films